Three Dark Horses is a 1952 short subject directed by Jules White starring American slapstick comedy team The Three Stooges (Moe Howard, Larry Fine and Shemp Howard). It is the 142nd entry in the series released by Columbia Pictures starring the comedians, who released 190 shorts for the studio between 1934 and 1959.

Plot
The Stooges are janitors-turned-delegates after being recruited to support bad news political candidate Hammond Egger. Egger's corrupt campaign manager Bill Wick (Kenneth MacDonald) and his assistant Jim Digger (Ben Welden) are desperate after the original three delegates departed the campaign after realizing Egger was rotten. Upon finding the bumbling Stooges, who nearly destroy Digger's toupee after vacuuming it from his head, Wick is enthralled. He hires the Stooges outright, and lays out their responsibilities as delegates. They gladly accept and start caucusing.

It does not take long for the Stooges to realize that Egger is a crook, and throw their votes to opposing candidate Abel Lamb Stewer. When Wick finds out that his new boys have double-crossed him, he comes looking for revenge, with the trio defeating Wick and Digger in a wild fight with the boys winning by capsizing them in the bathtub.

Cast

Credited
 Moe Howard as Moe
 Larry Fine as Larry
 Shemp Howard as Shemp
 Kenneth MacDonald as Wm. 'Bill' Wick
 Ben Welden as Jim Digger

Uncredited
 Bud Jamison as Hammond Egger (picture) (who had died)
 Jules White as voice of TV reporter

Production notes
Although he never appears in the film, a photo of candidate Hammond Egger appears several times in Three Dark Horses. The photo is actually of supporting actor Bud Jamison, who died suddenly in 1944. The inclusion of his photo in the film was done as tribute to the actor, whose talents were missed during the post-Curly Howard era. This is the sixteenth and final Stooge short with the word "three" in the title.

Hammond Egger is a pun on "ham and egger", nickname for a supporter of the Ham and Eggs Movement in California during the Great Depression. This was a simplistic share-our-wealth movement inspired by the then recently deceased Huey Long. The implication is that Hammond Egger supporters will be ordinary people who are not very bright, as well as looking for a handout. It was also a slang term for someone working a menial job, the implication being that ham and eggs (a relatively cheap dish) would be the only substantial thing he could afford to eat. (Before the ham-and-eggs movement, the Stooges used a ham and eggs gag in A Pain in the Pullman (1936). They called a boarding house owner "Mrs. Hammond Eggerly", implying that the board (food) supplied at her place would be cheap eats for laborers.)

The Stooges had also done a "ham and eggs" gag earlier in You Nazty Spy! (1940), this time with a specific reference to the movement. Hitleresque dictator Moe Hailstone is whipping up a mob with demagogic promises, including "Every Thursday you will receive...ham-burger and eggs!" (A slogan of the ham-and-eggs movement had been "$30 every Thursday".) An extra gag here is that changing "ham and eggs" to "hamburger and eggs" makes the dish kosher, probably not something on Hailstone’s mind at all.

A generation later, wrestling announcer Bobby Heenan would refer to dim fans and untalented wrestlers as "ham-and-eggers".

Three Dark Horses was filmed from 26–28 August 1952. It was released on 16 October 1952, just 19 days before the actual 1952 United States presidential election between Republican Dwight D. Eisenhower and Democrat Adlai Stevenson II.

References

External links 
 
 
Three Dark Horses at threestooges.net

1952 films
1952 comedy films
The Three Stooges films
American black-and-white films
Films directed by Jules White
Columbia Pictures short films
American comedy short films
1950s English-language films
1950s American films